Pashupatinagar may refer to:

Pashupatinagar, Janakpur, Nepal
Pashupatinagar, Mechi, Nepal